Bolus may refer to:

Geography
 Bolus, Iran, a village in Ardabil Province, Iran
 Bolus, or Baulus, an Anatolian village on the site of ancient Berissa

Medicine
 Bolus (digestion), a ball-shaped mass moving through the digestive tract
 Bolus (medicine), the administration of a drug, medication or other substance in the form of a single, large dose
 Bolus (radiation therapy), a tissue equivalent substance used in radiation therapy
 Bolus tracking, technique used in computed tomography imaging, to visualise vessels more clearly
 Triple bolus test, a medical diagnostic procedure used to assess pituitary function

People with the name
 Bolus of Mendes (3rd century BC), esoteric Greek philosopher
 Brian Bolus (born 1934), former English cricketer who played in 7 Tests from 1963
 Frank Bolus (1864–1939), English cricketer for Somerset
 Harry Bolus (1834–1911), South African botanist, botanical artist, businessman and philanthropist
 Edward John Bolus (1897–?), poet, civil servant, and clergyman
 Louisa Bolus (Harriet Margaret Louisa Bolus née Kensit, 1877–1970), South African botanist
 Malvina Bolus (1906–1997), Canadian historian and art collector, and editor of the Hudson's Bay Company magazine The Beaver

Other uses
 Bolus, a type of space tether, in spaceflight
 Bolus armenus, an example of a bole (a reddish soft variety of clay used as a pigment)
 Bolus Herbarium, an herbarium at the University of Cape Town established in 1865 from a donation by Harry Bolus
 Bolus hook, an instrument in a Jacquard loom
 Zeeuwse Bolus, a pastry from the Netherlands
Bolus (Belgium), a Belgian pastry

See also
 Bolas (disambiguation)